The Washington D.C. Area Film Critics Association Award for Best Film is an annual award given out by the Washington D.C. Area Film Critics Association.

Winners

2000s

2010s

2020s

See also
Academy Award for Best Picture

References

Film, Best
Awards for best film